Oakwood Historic District is a national historic district located in High Point, Guilford County, North Carolina.  The district encompasses 28 contributing buildings in a residential section of High Point developed between 1902 and 1927.  They include notable examples of Queen Anne, Colonial Revival, and Bungalow / American Craftsman style architecture.

It was listed on the National Register of Historic Places in 1991.

References

Buildings and structures in High Point, North Carolina
Historic districts on the National Register of Historic Places in North Carolina
Queen Anne architecture in North Carolina
Colonial Revival architecture in North Carolina
National Register of Historic Places in Guilford County, North Carolina